Daniel Hemetsberger (born 23 May 1991) is an Austrian World Cup alpine ski racer who specializes in downhill. He achieved his first podium in January 2022, finishing third in a downhill at Kitzbühel.

World Cup results

Season standings

Race podiums
0 wins
2 podiums (2 DH); 14 top tens

World Championship results

Olympic results

References

External links

1991 births
Living people
Austrian male alpine skiers
People from Vöcklabruck
Alpine skiers at the 2022 Winter Olympics
Olympic alpine skiers of Austria
Sportspeople from Upper Austria